Francis Strother Lyon (February 25, 1800 – December 31, 1882) was a prominent Alabama attorney and politician. He served two terms in the Confederate States Congress during the American Civil War after being an antebellum member of the United States Congress.

Early life
Lyon was born in Stokes County, North Carolina, the son of James Lyon and Behetheland Gaines Lyon.  He was a nephew of General Edmund Pendleton Gaines and Col. George Strother Gaines, prominent figures in Alabama history.  Lyon moved to Marengo County, Alabama, in 1817 to live with his uncle George Gaines and was admitted to the bar in 1821. His primary residence was at Bluff Hall in Demopolis, with a country estate nearby at Bermuda Hill.  Lyon was secretary of the State Senate from 1822 to 1830, and then served in the Alabama State Senate from 1833 to 1834. He represented Alabama's Fifth District in the United States House of Representatives from 1835 to 1839. From 1845 to 1853, Lyon served as a commissioner in charge of administering the bankrupt state banking system.

Civil War
At the start of the Civil War, he served in the Alabama State House of Representatives in 1861. Lyon then represented Alabama in the First Confederate Congress and the Second Confederate Congress from 1862 to 1865.

Postbellum
Following the collapse of the Confederacy in the spring of 1865, Lyon eventually returned home and resumed his legal career. He was elected as a delegate to the 1875 Alabama constitutional convention and was elected to the State Senate again in 1876.  Lyon died in Demopolis, Alabama, and was buried there in Riverside Cemetery's Glover Mausoleum. His daughter, Ida Ashe Lyon (1845-1912), married physician William Mecklenburg Polk, and was the mother of Frank Polk, who served as counselor to the Department of State through World War One and later became the first US Under Secretary of State.

References

 Retrieved on 2009-04-14
 Political Graveyard

External links

1800 births
1882 deaths
People from Stokes County, North Carolina
National Republican Party members of the United States House of Representatives from Alabama
Whig Party members of the United States House of Representatives from Alabama
Members of the Confederate House of Representatives from Alabama
Democratic Party members of the Alabama House of Representatives
Democratic Party Alabama state senators
People from Demopolis, Alabama
Alabama lawyers
19th-century American lawyers